The Grif H2000 is an Italian high-wing, single and two-place family of hang gliders, designed and produced by Grif Italia, of Castel Sant'Elia.

Design and development
The H2000 was designed for beginners and for flight training and has been progressively improved since its introduction in 1995 under the name Hobby. The H2000 is built in four sizes, with the single place versions designated by their approximate wing area in square meters.

The aircraft is made from aluminum tubing, with the wing covered in Dacron sailcloth. Its wing is cable braced from a single kingpost and has a nose angle of 120°. Unlike many training and beginner gliders the H2000 is not a single surface wing, but has about 50% double surface that encloses the crossbar.

The manufacturer provides a long list of options for the glider, including Hall wheels, ergonomic speed bar, rubber covered upright tubes and a Trilam wing leading edge.

Variants
H2000 14
H2000 15
H2000 16
H2000 Bi
H2000 CAB

Specifications (H2000 15)

References

External links

Hang gliders